Elias Muukka (10 June 1853 – 2 October 1938) was a Finnish painter. He mainly painted landscapes, usually from the rural areas of Karelia and from Turku.

Biography
He was born at the village of Suontakainen in Lemi, Finland. He attended school at Vyborg. He studied at the Academy of Fine Arts, Helsinki in 1874–1877, at the Düsseldorf Art Academy in 1877–1879 and at the Académie Colarossi in Paris 1880–1881.

Following his début in 1876, he exhibited regularly at the Finnish Artists Exhibitions from 1892 to 1938. His works were also presented in Paris (1889) and Stockholm (1929). Muukka adopted the style of the Düsseldorf School. Typical of the Düsseldorf School, his work often includes landscapes of water scenes featuring figures.

He worked as a drawing instructor at the seminar in Sordavala in Karelia in 1883-1885 and founded a private school for drawing and painting in Vaasa in 1886. He worked as an instructor at Turku between 1891–1918. Later he was a teacher at the upper secondary schools in Savonlinna and Mikkeli until 1927.

Muukka was one of the artists who joined Victor Westerholm (1860–1919) in the artists colony at Önningeby on the island of Åland in the late 1880s. He lived from 1933 until his death during 1938 at Helsinki.

Gallery

See also
 Golden Age of Finnish Art
 Finnish art

References

1853 births
1938 deaths
People from Lemi
People from Viipuri Province (Grand Duchy of Finland)
19th-century Finnish painters
Finnish male painters
19th-century Finnish male artists